Stare Gardzienice  is a village in east-central Poland, in the administrative district of Gmina Ciepielów, within Lipsko County, Masovian Voivodeship.

References

Stare Gardzienice